Aaron Smith (born 1976) is an American writer, illustrator, and inventor of magic tricks.

Mr. Gadfly Magazine
Aaron Smith was the creator and managing editor of Mr. Gadfly, Journal for Card Magicians, from 2001 to 2002. Mr. Gadfly gained notoriety among magicians as the first magic magazine with a forum devoted solely to its content, wherein readers could communicate directly with the magazine's columnists. Mr. Gadfly was also the first magic magazine published in both electronic and print formats. Magicians subscribed to the print edition and received the electronic issues free.

Companies
Aaron Smith is the founder of The Magic Depot, a magic trick retailer in Oklahoma, and Gadfly Magic, the production company for his more than one-hundred products currently distributed to magicians worldwide. Much of his earlier work is now out of print.

Magic Broadcast
Though a silent partner at the time, along with Gerald Kirchner and Ryan Pilling, in 2004 Aaron Smith founded the now defunct Magic Broadcast. Magic Broadcast was the first radio station devoted solely to magic. The station quickly grew to six satellite offices operating in three countries, the U.S., Canada, and the U. K.

Magic Products 
Some of Aaron Smith's magic productions include Mind Leaper (1999), Silk Through Card (1992), Behold the Scarabaeus (2006), Poor Boy ZipTie Escape (2009), STAT Bloody Tongue Skewer (2010), Mental Marker Special FX Pen (2010) and Mental Marker FX Juice (2012), Borrowed & Tied (2011), Flight of the Bubble Gum (2011), Wand Scrolls (2012), Flight Force Five (2012), Poor Boy Billet Knife (2008), and the Old World Siberian Chain Escape (2013) and Ankle Chain Quick-Connect (2013). Aaron Smith introduced the Wizard PK Ring to the U.S. magic community in 2006 on behalf of its inventors. He also negotiated permission for the term "PK" from Magic City, who became the first U. S. magic jobber for the Wizard PK Ring and Vortex PK Ring product lines.

Author

 The crime thriller, "No Family For Cannibals - Episode One," was released in July 2014 as part of 412C Season One, under the name Aaron K Smith.

See also
List of magicians
The Magic Circle
The Magic Castle
Society of American Magicians

References

External links 
Official blog
The Magic Depot
Gadfly Magic (production Company)
No Family For Cannibals (crime thriller)

1976 births
Living people
American magicians
Entertainers from Oklahoma
Thrillers
American male novelists
Novelists from Oklahoma
21st-century American inventors